William Graham was a politician in Queensland, Australia. He was a Member of the Queensland Legislative Assembly and a Member of the Queensland Legislative Council.

Politics
William Graham was elected to the Queensland Legislative Assembly for Darling Downs at a by-election on 23 March 1875. He held the seat until 26 November 1878 when he made a last-minute decision to not contest the 1878 election.

Graham was appointed to the Queensland Legislative Council on 5 August 1880. Being a lifetime appointment, he served until his death on 7 June 1892.

Personal life
Graham married Louisa Elizabeth Turner on 9 January 1864 in Brisbane.

Graham was buried in the Toowong Cemetery.

References

Members of the Queensland Legislative Assembly
Members of the Queensland Legislative Council
Burials at Toowong Cemetery
1836 births
1892 deaths
19th-century Australian politicians